Fenelon Falls Secondary School (FFSS) is a public high school located at 66 Lindsay Street in Fenelon Falls, Ontario, Canada. FFSS was founded in 1827.  , it has about 1,000 students and 90 teachers and support staff.  It is a member of the Trillium Lakelands District School Board. It was previously in the Victoria County Board of Education.

History
FFSS was founded around 1827 and the current school building is located on the south side of Fenelon Falls. Since its erection, the building has gone through a number of renovations, adding a new gymnasium and part of an art wing.

Campus
The school consists of three floors, the third being the greenhouse and the associated classroom attached.  Portables also serve as classrooms located just outside, at the back-right of the school.  A large field and track are situated past the road behind the back of the school, available for physical education classes and sporting events, with nearby tennis courts providing for tennis-oriented physical education lessons.

Notable alumni
Linwood Barclay – columnist and author
Jenni Byrne – political advisor
Bruce McArthur – serial killer
Emily Haines – Singer, songwriter, musician - Metric, Broken Social Scene, Emily Haines & The Soft Skeleton
 Avery Haines – tv personality/journalist - W5

See also
List of high schools in Ontario

References

http://www.tldsb.on.ca/Schools/ffss/index.htm

External links

High schools in Kawartha Lakes
Educational institutions established in 1827
1827 establishments in Upper Canada